Vodanj  is a village in the municipality of Smederevo, Serbia. According to the 2011 census, the village has a population of 1283 people. According to 2011 Census of Population, Households and Dwellings in the Republic of Serbia .

References

Populated places in Podunavlje District